Boneh-ye Arun (also Romanized as Boneh-ye Ārūn; also known as Bonahārūn) is a village in Donbaleh Rud-e Shomali Rural District, Dehdez District, Izeh County, Khuzestan Province, Iran. At the 2006 census, its population was 99, in 18 families.

References 

Populated places in Izeh County